is a Japanese female mixed martial arts (MMA) fighter.

Mogi has participated in MMA promotions Smackgirl, Shooto and Valkyrie. She formerly worked as Valkyrie's producer (matchmaker) and is now a producer for Jewels.

Background

Mixed martial arts career
Smack F Festival during The Next Cinderella Tournament 2005 portion of the event, submitting Gravure idol, actress, and tarento Ai Fukaya with an armbar.

On , Mogi debuted with the Shooto promotion at G-Shooto Plus 02 and defeated Masako Yoshida by unanimous decision.

On , Mogi defeated Ayumi Takeuchi by submission (rear naked choke) at Shooto 6/26 in Kitazawa Town Hall.

On  at Valkyrie 05, Mogi was defeated by Akiko Naito, this time by unanimous decision.

Mogi missed weight for the fight and was defeated by TKO early in the second round.

On , Mogi faced Takumi Umehara at Jewels 23rd Ring. She was defeated by unanimous decision.

She was defeated by split decision.

Submission grappling career

Mogi debuted in submission grappling in 1998 in a Brazilian Jiu-Jitsu tournament.

Mixed martial arts record

|-
| Loss
| align=center| 3-9
| Yuko Oya
| Decision (split)
| Deep Jewels 1
| 
| align=center| 2
| align=center| 5:00
| Kabukicho, Tokyo, Japan
| 
|-
| Loss
| align=center| 3-8
| Takumi Umehara
| Decision (unanimous)
| Jewels 23rd Ring
| 
| align=center| 2
| align=center| 5:00
| Kabukicho, Tokyo, Japan
| 
|-
| Loss
| align=center| 3-7
| Keiko Tomita
| TKO (punches)
| Jewels 22nd Ring
| 
| align=center| 2
| align=center| 0:20
| Ariake, Tokyo, Japan
| 
|-
| Loss
| align=center| 3-6
| Akiko Naito
| Decision (unanimous)
| Valkyrie 05
| 
| align=center| 3
| align=center| 3:00
| Ariake, Tokyo, Japan
| 
|-
| Loss
| align=center| 3-5
| Misaki Takimoto
| TKO (punches)
| Valkyrie 03
| 
| align=center| 3
| align=center| 0:51
| Ariake, Tokyo, Japan
| 
|-
| Loss
| align=center| 3-4
| Masako Yoshida
| Decision (split)
| Shooto: Spirit 2009
| 
| align=center| 2
| align=center| 5:00
| Sendai, Miyagi, Japan
| 
|-
| Win
| align=center| 3-3
| Ayumi Takeuchi
| Submission (rear-naked choke)
| Shooto: 6/26 in Kitazawa Town Hall
| 
| align=center| 1
| align=center| 2:45
| Setagaya, Tokyo, Japan
| 
|-
| Loss
| align=center| 2-3
| Akiko Naito
| Decision (split)
| Smackgirl: The Next Cinderella Tournament 2007 First Stage
| 
| align=center| 2
| align=center| 5:00
| Kabukicho, Tokyo, Japan
| 
|-
| Loss
| align=center| 2-2
| Taeko Nagamine
| Decision (split)
| Smackgirl 2006: Queen's Triumphant Return
| 
| align=center| 2
| align=center| 5:00
| Taisho-ku, Osaka, Japan
| 
|-
| Loss
| align=center| 2-1
| Hisae Watanabe
| TKO (punches)
| Smackgirl 2005: Lightweight Anniversary
| 
| align=center| 1
| align=center| 4:03
| Bunkyo, Tokyo, Japan
| 
|-
| Win
| align=center| 2-0
| Masako Yoshida
| Decision (unanimous)
| G-Shooto: Plus02
| 
| align=center| 2
| align=center| 5:00
| Setagaya, Tokyo, Japan
| 
|-
| Win
| align=center| 1-0
| Ai Fukaya
| Submission (armbar)
| Smackgirl-F 2005: I'll do it this year! Smack F Festival
| 
| align=center| 1
| align=center| 3:50
| Setagaya, Tokyo, Japan
|

Submission grappling

|-
| 
| Loss
|  Kyoko Abe
| Gi Grappling 2008
| Tokyo, Japan
| Decision (points 0-0, advantages 0–1)
| align="center"|N/A
| align="center"|N/A
| align="center"|8-5-0
| 
|-
| 
| Win
|  Yuko Yamazaki
| Smackgirl Grappling Queen Tournament 2007
| Setagaya, Tokyo, Japan
| Decision (points 4–3)
| align="center"|1
| align="center"|7:00
| align="center"|8-4-0
| 
|-
| 
| Loss
|  Kyoko Takabayashi
| Smackgirl Grappling Queen Tournament 2007
| Setagaya, Tokyo, Japan
| Submission (rear-naked choke)
| align="center"|1
| align="center"|1:30
| align="center"|7-4-0
| 
|-
| 
| Win
|  Saori Ishioka
| Smackgirl Grappling Queen Tournament 2007
| Setagaya, Tokyo, Japan
| Decision (points 2–0)
| align="center"|1
| align="center"|7:00
| align="center"|7-3-0
| 
|-
| 
| Loss
|  Sayaka Shioda
| ADCC Japan Trial final qualifier
| Tokyo, Japan
| Submission (guillotine choke)
| align="center"|1
| align="center"|N/A
| align="center"|6-3-0
| 
|-
| 
| Win
|  Mei Yamaguchi
| ADCC Japan Trial final qualifier
| Tokyo, Japan
| Decision (points 6–2)
| align="center"|1
| align="center"|N/A
| align="center"|6-2-0
| 
|-
| 
| Win
|  Yuko Yamazaki
| G-Shooto Plus 01
| Tokyo, Japan
| Submission (armbar)
| align="center"|2
| align="center"|1:25
| align="center"|5-2-0
| 
|-
| 
| Win
|  Yasuko Tamada
| Smackgirl F: 5-tsuki Byo o But Tobase! Natsu mo Chikai zo Sumakku F Sai
| Tokyo, Japan
| Decision (unanimous)
| align="center"|2
| align="center"|4:00
| align="center"|4-2-0
| 
|-
| 
| Win
|  Yuki Sugiuchi
| Smackgirl F: 5-tsuki Byo o But Tobase! Natsu mo Chikai zo Sumakku F Sai
| Tokyo, Japan
| Decision (unanimous)
| align="center"|2
| align="center"|4:00
| align="center"|3-2-0
| 
|-
| 
| Win
|  Asami Kodera
| Smackgirl F: 5-tsuki Byo o But Tobase! Natsu mo Chikai zo Sumakku F Sai
| Tokyo, Japan
| Submission (armbar)
| align="center"|2
| align="center"|1:49
| align="center"|2-2-0
| 
|-
| 
| Loss
|  Yasuko Tamada
| All-Japan Shooto Grappling Championships
| Tokyo, Japan
| N/A
| align="center"|N/A
| align="center"|N/A
| align="center"|1-2-0
| 
|-
| 
| Loss
|  Rie Imazawa
| Smackgirl Third Season-EX: Grappler's holiday
| Tokyo, Japan
| Decision (split)
| align="center"|3
| align="center"|3
| align="center"|1-1-0
| 
|-
| 
| Win
|  Maiko Okado
| Smackgirl Third Season-EX: Grappler's holiday
| Tokyo, Japan
| Decision (split)
| align="center"|3
| align="center"|3
| align="center"|1-0-0
| 
|-
| colspan=10 | Legend:

Championships and accomplishments
13th all-Japan amateur Shooto championship women's flyweight winner (2006)
14th all-Japan amateur Shooto championship women's flyweight winner (2007)
15th all-Japan amateur Shooto championship women's flyweight winner (2008)

See also
List of female mixed martial artists

References

External links
 Yasuko Mogi Awakening Profile

Profile at Fightergirls.com
 
Official blog 
Official blog (matchmaker) at kakutoh.com 

1969 births
Living people
Japanese female mixed martial artists
Mixed martial artists utilizing Brazilian jiu-jitsu
Female Brazilian jiu-jitsu practitioners
Japanese practitioners of Brazilian jiu-jitsu
People from Nerima